Sclerochloa dura is a species of grass known by the common names common hardgrass and fairground grass. It is native to Eurasia, and it is known in parts of North America and Australia as an introduced species and a common weed of disturbed, high-traffic areas such as parking lots, roadsides, and playing fields. It is a sturdy annual grass forming low, flat clumps of short stems, some prostrate and some upright. The flat, overlapping leaf blades are a few centimeters long. The inflorescence is a crowded, one-sided series of flattened spikelets.

External links
Jepson Manual Treatment
USDA Plants Profile
Grass Manual Treatment
Washington Burke Museum

Pooideae